Xanthe Huynh is an American voice actress known for her voicework in English dubs of anime series. Her most well known roles include Ui Hirasawa in K-On!, Sachi in Sword Art Online, Yuna in Yuki Yuna is a Hero, Hanayo Koizumi in Love Live!, Alluka Zoldyck in Hunter x Hunter, Haru Okumura in Persona 5, Marianne in Fire Emblem: Three Houses, Meiko "Menma" Honma in Anohana: The Flower We Saw That Day, and Altina Orion in The Legend of Heroes: Trails of Cold Steel III.

Filmography

Anime

Animation

Film

Video games

Live-action

References

External links
 
 
 

Living people
Actresses from Los Angeles
Actresses of Vietnamese descent
American video game actresses
American voice actresses
People from Irvine, California
Place of birth missing (living people)
University of California, Irvine alumni
21st-century American actresses
Year of birth missing (living people)